Portugal is competing at the 2013 World Aquatics Championships in Barcelona, Spain between 19 July and 4 August 2013.

Open water swimming

Portugal qualified three quota places for the following events in open water swimming.

Swimming

Portuguese swimmers achieved qualifying standards in the following events (up to a maximum of 2 swimmers in each event at the A-standard entry time, and 1 at the B-standard):

Men

Women

See also
 Portugal at the 2013 World Championships in Athletics

References

External links
Barcelona 2013 Official Site
FPN web site 

Nations at the 2013 World Aquatics Championships
2013 in Portuguese sport
Portugal at the World Aquatics Championships